Sarita Khajuria (1974 – March 19, 2003) was a British actress of Indian and Finnish descent.

Personal life
Khajuria was born to an Indian father and a Finnish mother. She studied at the North London Collegiate School and gained 5 A grade A-levels. She then went to University and gained a master's degree in International Journalism.

Film appearance
She made her only major film appearance in the 1993 film Bhaji on the Beach which was directed by Gurinder Chadha. She played Hashida, one of the major characters in the film who decides not to abort her unborn illegitimate child while on a trip to Blackpool. She also played an uncredited extra in Gurinder Chadha's 2002 hit film Bend It Like Beckham. Apart from these two film appearances she did not act in any other film.

Death
In March 2003, she was mysteriously found dead in the River Thames near Albert Bridge. She was thought to have drowned or committed suicide. The official verdict on her death has been left open to speculation but there has been no proof that her death was murder or suicide. The last time she was seen was boarding a train from Paris to London Waterloo. Her body was found with her backpack but her passport and suitcase was missing. Her death remains a mystery to this day.

References

External links
Sarita Khajuria's mysterious death
Sarita Khajuria at IMDB

1974 births
2003 deaths
English film actresses
British actresses of Indian descent
Deaths by drowning in the United Kingdom
English people of Finnish descent
English people of Indian descent